Lieutenant-Colonel Sir Henry Bayly  (24 April 1790 – 31 January 1867) was a British Army officer.

Bayly was born in Bath, Somerset, the son of Zachary and Sarah Bayly of Bideford, Devon, where he began his career as a clerk in 1806. He served in the army at the Walcheren Campaign and the Peninsular War and lost an arm at San Sebastián. Bayly was first married in 1817 to Mary Jolliffe, then in 1829 to Martha Fisher.  His eldest son, Vere Temple Bayly, was also a soldier.

Bayly died at Lyme Regis in 1867, aged 76.

References

1790 births
1867 deaths
Knights Bachelor
British Army officers
British Army personnel of the Peninsular War
Military personnel from Bideford
Deputy Lieutenants of Dorset